Eremias isfahanica is a species of lizard endemic to Iran.

References

Eremias
Reptiles described in 2016
Taxa named by Eskandar Rastegar Pouyani
Taxa named by Saeed Hosseinian
Taxa named by Soolmaz Rafiee
Taxa named by Haji Gholi Kami
Taxa named by Mehdi Rajabizadeh
Taxa named by Michael Wink